Stromness Bay is a bay  wide, entered between Cape Saunders and Busen Point on the north coast of South Georgia.

Stromness Bay, like Leith Harbour takes its name from a location in Scotland, Stromness, on the Orkney Mainland. This is partially because both places called Stromness were whaling centres.

The headland forming the southeast side of the entrance to Stromness Bay is named Busen Point, Bucentaur Rock lies close northeast of Busen Point.

History
It was probably first seen in 1775 by Captain James Cook, and named in about 1912, presumably by Norwegian whalers who frequented its harbours.

Its historical significance is that it represents the destination of Ernest Shackleton's epic rescue journey in 1916.

During the Second World War the whaling stations were closed excepting Grytviken and Leith Harbour. Most of the British and Norwegian whaling factories and catchers were destroyed by German raiders, while the rest were called up to serve under Allied command. The resident British Magistrates (W. Barlas and A.I. Fleuret) attended to the island's defence throughout the War. The Royal Navy armed the merchant vessel Queen of Bermuda to patrol South Georgian and Antarctic waters, and deployed two four-inch guns at key locations protecting the approaches to Cumberland Bay and Stromness Bay, i.e. to Grytviken and Leith Harbour respectively. These batteries (still present) were manned by volunteers from among the Norwegian whalers who were trained for the purpose.

The three whaling stations, Husvik, Stromness and Leith Harbour were linked by a rough track along the beach. During the whaling era, whalers from Stromness and Husvik would use it to get to Leith Harbour to use the island's one cinema.

See also
Stromness Whaling Station
Discovery Rock
First Milestone
Husvik
Leith Harbour
Middle Ground Rock
Scottish placenames in other countries

Bays of South Georgia
Falkland Islands in World War II